Lactarius azonites is a species of fungus belonging to the family Russulaceae.

It is native to Europe and Northern America.

References

azonites